The Gang of Oss is a 2011 Dutch crime drama period film directed by André van Duren starring Sylvia Hoeks and Matthias Schoenaerts. It tells the story of a woman involved with the criminal gangs of the town of Oss in the Netherlands in the 1930s. The film is partly based on real events.

The film won the Golden Film award after selling over 100,000 tickets at the box office.

Cast
Sylvia Hoeks as Johanna van Heesch
Matthias Schoenaerts as Ties van Heesch
Pierre Bokma as Sal Hedeman
Frank Lammers as Harry den Brock
Daan Schuurmans as Wachtmeester Roelofse
Marcel Musters as Wim de Kuiper
Theo Maassen as Van Schijndel
Maria Kraakman as Trees Biemans
Benja Bruijning as Jan
Elle van Rijn as Ellie

References

External links 
 
 
 
 Official website

2011 films
2011 crime drama films
Dutch crime drama films
2010s Dutch-language films
Films about organized crime in the Netherlands
Dutch historical films
Films set in the 1930s
Films about prostitution in the Netherlands
Films set in the Netherlands
Films shot in the Netherlands
Films directed by André van Duren